Spulerina simploniella (bark miner) is a moth of the family Gracillariidae. It is found in Europe.

The moths flies from June to July depending on the location.

The larvae feed on the bark of oaks and birches.

References

External links
 www.schmetterlinge-deutschlands.de

Spulerina
Moths of Europe
Moths of Asia
Taxa named by Josef Emanuel Fischer von Röslerstamm
Moths described in 1844